Kattathurai is a village located in Kanyakumari district of Tamil Nadu, India on National Highway 47 approximately 44 km south east of Trivandrum.It is a lush green village which has about 1500 families. The village has many ponds primarily meant for irrigation interlinked by canals of water.Other than irrigation the canals also serve as public baths. In the absence of canal irrigation, there is abundance of ground water due to which the village is hardly drought prone. Despite the not so flat terrain, the fertile soil can nurture a variety of crops and trees. The village used to have paddy fields, pineapples, Mango groves, Jack fruit trees and some native fruit bearing trees unique to the area. But lately Rubber is rapidly becoming the cash crop of choice.

The people whose principal occupation was farming have changed in recent years. The second generation after independence have been educated. They work in different parts of the country and overseas. The families get together on occasions of festivities for a bonding.

Educational Institute 
"St.Michael's Matriculation Higher Secondary School, Kattathurai" is the largest and one of the FAMOUS School in Tamil Nadu.

"PACKIANATH CBSC SCHOOL, KATTATHURAI" is the CBSE School in Kattathurai Junction.

" Kattathurai HIgh School " is among the old and famous schools where majority of people have taken their education from. Many paddy fields, coconut fields, rubber plantations and a small temple are among the places inside Kattathurai.

Church 
Bethel Mission Church (BMC), Kattathurai is one of the biggest Church in Kanyakumari District.

Villages in Kanyakumari district